Jerome Turner (February 18, 1942 – February 12, 2000) was a United States district judge of the United States District Court for the Western District of Tennessee.

Education and career

Born in Memphis, Tennessee, Turner received a Bachelor of Arts degree from Washington and Lee University in 1964 and a Bachelor of Laws from Washington and Lee University School of Law in 1966. He was a law clerk for Judge Robert Malcolm McRae Jr. of the United States District Court for the Western District of Tennessee from 1966 to 1967. He was in private practice in Memphis from 1967 to 1988.

Federal judicial service

On July 1, 1987, Turner was nominated by President Ronald Reagan to the very seat on the United States District Court for the Western District of Tennessee vacated by McRae. Turner was confirmed by the United States Senate on December 8, 1987, and received his commission on December 9, 1987. Turner served in that capacity until his death, on February 12, 2000, in Memphis.

References

Sources
 

1942 births
2000 deaths
Judges of the United States District Court for the Western District of Tennessee
People from Memphis, Tennessee
United States district court judges appointed by Ronald Reagan
20th-century American judges
Washington and Lee University alumni
Washington and Lee University School of Law alumni
20th-century American lawyers